The Straw Hat Matinee is an American television series that ran on NBC from June 25 to September 7, 1951.

The series was hosted by Mel Martin and Rosemary Olberding, and was broadcast from Cincinnati. The Ernie Lee Orchestra with June Perkins also appeared on the program.

Notable People 
 Rod Serling contributed to the series by writing "'continuity' patter" for the program.

See also 
 1950–51 United States network television schedule (weekday)

References

1951 American television series debuts
1951 American television series endings
1950s American variety television series